Hossein Hassani-Sa'di was an Iranian regular military (Artesh) officer who served as the deputy commander of the Khatam-al Anbiya Central Headquarters. He was assassinated in Tehran on May 22 2022.

Military career 
Hassani-Sa'di served at the 81 Armored Division of Kermanshah during early years of his career. Following the Iranian Revolution, he was appointed as the commander of the cadets regiment at the Officers' School. During the Iran–Iraq War, he fought in the Operation Fatholmobin and Operation Beitolmoqadas.

Subsequently, he received two promotions for his impressive performance in the battlefield, and was appointed the commander of the 21st Division. He became commander of Iran's southern front (Nasr HQ) and directed much of the Battle of Faw. He replaced Ali Sayad Shirazi as the Artesh Ground Force commander in the spring of 1986, for his success in the latter operation. At the time, he was a 45-year-old officer with the rank of colonel.

Hassani-Sa'di was later promoted to Brigadier and after he left office as the Ground Force commander in 1991, he was appointed a military advisor to the Supreme Leader of Iran. He later held office as the deputy for interoperability and coordinating affairs in the General Staff of the Armed Forces of the Islamic Republic of Iran, and was promoted to the highest practically achievable rank in Iran, Major general. He was replaced by Ali Abdollahi in 2016.

See also 
 List of Iranian two-star generals since 1979

References

Islamic Republic of Iran Army major generals
Living people
Year of birth missing (living people)
Islamic Republic of Iran Army personnel of the Iran–Iraq War
Commanders of Islamic Republic of Iran Army Ground Force
Recipients of the Order of Fath